The Parish of Terrana is a parish of Argyle County, New South Wales, Australia.
 
The area is similar to the locality of Tirrannaville, which partly lies in the Goulburn Parish.

History
The area was first inhabited by the Gundungurra people, and by the mid 1840s the NSW colonial government had granted numerous land grants in area, beginning white settlement. 
A Public School was established in 1869. The area is today predominantly used for agriculture though it lies in the Sydney-Canberra transit corridor.

References

Parishes of Argyle County
Southern Tablelands